Poltava is a narrative poem written by Aleksandr Pushkin in 1828–29 about the involvement of the Ukrainian Cossack hetman Ivan Mazepa in the 1709 Battle of Poltava between Sweden and Russia.  This view is echoed by Svetlana Evdokimova (1999), who contrasts what she sees as unabashed patriotism of Poltava with the richer, more ambiguous portrayal of Peter I and Empire in The Bronze Horseman (1833).  Pushkin's biographer Henri Troyat suggested that Pushkin deliberately wrote a pro-Imperial poem in order to assuage Tsar Nicholas I, who was suspicious of his political loyalties after his return from exile.

Soviet critics tended to be more sympathetic towards the poem.  V.M. Zhirmunskii (1924) sees the poem as the moment of Pushkin's decisive break with Byron, arguing that Pushkin uses a moral and historical perspective to create psychological portraits and evaluations of his characters, while Byron relies on emotion alone.  S.M. Bondi argues that Pushkin successfully pulls together historical and personal themes and the poem is a valuable meditation on the place of the Russian state among European powers.  However, while Pushkin certainly made the claim that he was writing a historically-accurate poem,  Babinski points out "for all his insistence upon historicity, Pushkin slanted the facts."

Western critics who have been kinder to Poltava have focused on its characterization.  John Bayley says that Mazepa "has something of the depth of a Shakespeare portrait". David Bethea also suggests that Poltava owes something to Shakespearean characterization.  The most sympathetic treatment of the poem is offered in a book-length treatment by Virginia Burns (2005), which praises the poem for its successful characterization, tight structure and the scope of its philosophical inquiry.

Composition and publication
Pushkin's notebooks show that he began Poltava on April 5, 1828, and completed the rest of it in October: Song I on October 3, Song II on October 9, Song III on October 16 and the Dedication on October 27.  He finished the Foreword on 31 January 1829 and the poem was published later that year.

Influence
Tchaikovsky's 1884 opera Mazeppa was loosely based on Poltava.

References

Sources
Pushkin, A.S., tr. Walter Arndt. (1984) Collected Narrative and Lyric Poetry. Ann Arbor, Michigan: Ardis.  (Inc. recent translation of Poltava)
Pushkin, A.S. (1949) Polnoe sobranie sochinenii v desiati tomakh.  Moscow and Leningrad: Izd. Akademiia Nauk SSSR.
Burns, Virginia. (2005) Pushkin's Poltava: a literary structuralist interpretation. Lanham, Maryland: University Press of America.
Babinski, H. F. (1974). The Mazeppa legend in European Romanticism. New York, Columbia University Press.
 Prymak, Thomas M., "The Cossack Hetman: Ivan Mazepa in History and Legend from Peter to Pushkin," The Historian, LXXVII, 2 (2014), 237-77.

External links 
  The text of Poltava at Russian Wikisource
 Ivan Eubanks' translation of Poltava (2008) at the Pushkin Review

Poetry by Aleksandr Pushkin
1829 poems
Historical poems
Cultural depictions of Ivan Mazepa